Chris Spelius (born September 10, 1951) is an American sprint canoer who competed in the mid-1980s. He was eliminated in the repechages of the K-4 1000 m event at the 1984 Summer Olympics in Los Angeles.

References
Sports-Reference.com profile

1951 births
American male canoeists
Canoeists at the 1984 Summer Olympics
Living people
Olympic canoeists of the United States
Place of birth missing (living people)